Knee prosthesis may refer to:
A prosthesis of the lower limb, starting at the knee
Knee replacement without replacing the rest of the leg.